St Nicholas' Church, Hockerton is a Grade II* listed parish church in the Church of England in Hockerton.

History

The church dates from the 12th century. It was restored in 1876 by Charles Hodgson Fowler.

It is in a joint parish with St Swithun's Church, Kirklington.

References

Church of England church buildings in Nottinghamshire
Grade II* listed churches in Nottinghamshire